The 2005–06 Icelandic Hockey League season was the 15th season of the Icelandic Hockey League, the top level of ice hockey in Iceland. Four teams participated in the league, and Skautafelag Reykjavikur won the championship.

Regular season

Playoffs

3rd place 
 Ísknattleiksfélagið Björninn - Narfi frá Hrísey 2:0 (7:1, 6:2)

Final 
 Skautafélag Reykjavíkur - Skautafélag Akureyrar 3:0 (8:1, 7:4, 10:4)

External links 
 2005-06 season.info

Icelandic Hockey League
Icelandic Hockey League seasons
2005–06 in Icelandic ice hockey